
The Chinese Literature and History Press is the publishing house of the Chinese People's Political Consultative Conference. It is based in Beijing.

History
The Literary and Historical Document Press was approved by the National Publishing Bureau in January 1980. It was renamed in November 1985.

Notes

References

External links
 Official website 

Publishing companies of China